Orthodoxy in Germany may refer to:

Eastern Orthodox Church in Germany
Oriental Orthodoxy in Germany